Évariste Payer (July 21, 1888 – September 1, 1963) was a Canadian professional ice hockey centre who played two seasons with the Montreal Canadiens in the National Hockey Association (NHA) and one game for the Canadiens in the National Hockey League (NHL).

Playing career
Payer played for the Montreal Canadiens in the defunct National Hockey Association (NHA) from 1910–11 to 1911–12. He then played senior hockey until 1915, when he joined the army. He re-joined the Canadiens in the NHA's successor National Hockey League (NHL) in 1917–18. Payer would play only 1 game in the NHL. His death is recorded as Sept. 1, 1963 on his gravestone at Notre Dame Cemetery in Gatineau, Quebec.

Career statistics
Note: GP = Games played, G = Goals, A = Assists, PTS = Points, PIM = Penalties In Minutes

References

External links
 

1888 births
1963 deaths
Canadian ice hockey centres
Canadian military personnel of World War I
Franco-Ontarian people
Ice hockey people from Ontario
Montreal Canadiens (NHA) players
Montreal Canadiens players
People from Clarence-Rockland